Dan Dare: Pilot of the Future is a computer-generated TV series produced first by Netter Digital then by Foundation Imaging, running to twenty-six 22-minute episodes.  The series drew on several different incarnations of the Dan Dare comic.

Cast
Chris Cox as Hank Hogan
Greg Ellis as Dan Dare
Julian Holloway as	Digby
Rob Paulsen as The Mekon
Carole Ruggier as 	Professor Jocelyn Peabody

Episode list

International broadcast
 Ireland
 TV3

References

External links
The Dan Dare Corporation Ltd

SPTI's Anime & Animation Brochure: Dan Dare

Dan Dare
2001 American television series debuts
2001 American television series endings
2000s American animated television series
2000s American science fiction television series
2001 British television series debuts
2001 British television series endings
2000s British animated television series
2000s British science fiction television series
British children's animated superhero television series
American children's animated science fiction television series
American computer-animated television series
British children's animated science fiction television series
British computer-animated television series
English-language television shows
Television series by Sony Pictures Television
Television shows based on comics